Deep Falls is a historic home located at Chaptico, St. Mary's County, Maryland, United States. It began as a one-story four-room frame house that was reportedly built in 1745. The house was apparently extensively remodeled at some time during the last two decades of the 18th century then again during the mid 19th century. Deep Falls has always been in the ownership of the Thomas family, descendants of Governor James Thomas of Maryland and the famous Civil War spy Richard Thomas (Zarvona). The family is still in ownership of the property today.

Deep Falls was listed on the National Register of Historic Places in 1975.

References

External links
, including photo from 1999, at Maryland Historical Trust

Houses on the National Register of Historic Places in Maryland
Houses in St. Mary's County, Maryland
Houses completed in the 18th century
National Register of Historic Places in St. Mary's County, Maryland